Ort may refer to:

Acronym
The acronym ORT can stand for:
Channel One Russia, called ORT (Obshchestvennoye Rossiskoye Televideniye) from 1995 to 2002
Ocean Racing Technology, a racing team
Ohio River Trail, trail system in Maryland, Pennsylvania, Ohio, and West Virginia, US
Olympiaki Radiofonia Tileorasi (Greek: Ολυμπιακή Ραδιοφωνία Τηλεόραση, abbreviated ORT), a Greek radio and television station
Ongoing reliability test, a test process in manufacturing
Ooty Radio Telescope, a radio telescope near Ooty, India
Open road tolling, boothless toll collecting
Operational readiness test
Opiate replacement therapy
Oral rehydration therapy, for diarrhea-related dehydration
Ornithobacterium rhinotracheale, a bacterium that causes poultry disease
Order of Railroad Telegraphers, a United States labor union
Organización Revolucionaria de los Trabajadores, a political party in Spain
Oxford Round Table, a series of interdisciplinary conferences
World ORT (Russian: Общество Ремесленного Труда (Obchestvo Remeslenogo Truda: Association for the Promotion of Skilled Trades), a non-governmental organization
ORT Argentina, a non-government organization devoted to education in Argentina
ORT Uruguay, a university in Montevideo, Uruguay by World ORT
ORT Israel, a non-government organization devoted to education in Israel
ORT Braude College of Engineering, in Carmiel Israel
Bramson ORT College, an undergraduate college in New York City operated by World ORT

People
Notable people with this surname include:
Bastiaan Ort (1854–1927), a Dutch lawyer, judge and politician
Donald R. Ort, American botanist and biochemist
Kaleb Ort (born 1992), American baseball player

Places
Northway Airport (IATA code: ORT), airport in Northway, Alaska, United States
Ort im Innkreis, a municipality in Ried im Innkreis, Austria
Palmer Ort, southernmost point of the German Baltic Sea island of Rügen and its peninsula of Zudar
Schloss Ort, an Austrian castle situated near the Traunsee lake

Other
Izzy Ort's Bar & Grille, a former live music venue in Boston, Massachusetts
Ort Wells (foaled 1901), American Thoroughbred two-time Champion racehorse

See also
Oort (disambiguation)
Orth (disambiguation)